Edward Atkinson (6 August 1819, Leeds – 1 March 1915, Cambridge) was Master of Clare College from 1856 to his death.

Atkinson was educated at  Leeds Grammar School and Clare College, Cambridge, matriculating in 1838, gaining a scholarship, graduating B.A. (3rd classic) 1842, M.A. 1845, B.D. 1853, D.D. 1859.

He became Fellow of Clare in 1842; and was ordained a priest of the Church of England in 1844; He was Vice-Chancellor of the University of Cambridge 1862–1863, 1868–1870, and 1876–1878.

References

Masters of Clare College, Cambridge
Fellows of Clare College, Cambridge
Alumni of Clare College, Cambridge
1915 deaths
1819 births
Clergy from Leeds
People educated at Leeds Grammar School